Sea Life is a chain of commercial sea life-themed aquarium attractions.  there are 53 Sea Life attractions (including standalone Sea Life centres, mini Sea Life features within resort theme parks, and Legoland submarine rides) around the world. The chain is owned by the British company, Merlin Entertainments.

History
Some of the aquariums now called Sea Life predate this rebrand and existed under different designations prior to their consolidation. The original named attraction was Sea Life Centre in Oban, Scotland, which opened in 1979. By 1992, nine other Sea Life units were open.

Locations

Asia

Sea Life Bangkok, Thailand
Sea Life Busan, South Korea
Legoland Japan, Japan
Legoland Malaysia, Malaysia
Sea Life Shanghai, China
Sea Life Sichuan, China (Opening in 2024)

In November 2015, Merlin Entertainments announced that over the next 10 years it would invest £50 million in India, some of which will be used to open Sea Life centres. In January 2017, Merlin Entertainments Indian subsidiary stated that it was in discussion with real estate firms to open Sea Life centres in multiple cities in India.

Europe

Germany

Sea Life Berlin, Berlin
Sea Life Hanover, Hanover
Sea Life Konstanz, Konstanz
Sea Life Munich, Munich
Sea Life Oberhausen, Oberhausen, This is the largest Sea Life Centre in Germany. This was the home of Paul, the psychic octopus who correctly predicted the German national football team's results at the world cup of 2010, until his death in October 2010.
Sea Life Speyer, Speyer
Sea Life Timmendorfer Strand, Timmendorfer Strand

United Kingdom

Alton Towers Resort, Staffordshire, England - Sharkbait Reef by Sea Life
Chessington World of Adventures, England - Chessington Sea Life Centre
Cornish Seal Sanctuary, Gweek, England
Legoland Windsor Resort, England - Atlantis Submarine Voyage
National Sea Life Centre, Birmingham, England
Sea Life Blackpool, Blackpool, England
Sea Life Brighton, Brighton, England
Sea Life Great Yarmouth, Great Yarmouth, England
Sea Life Hunstanton, Hunstanton, England
Sea Life Loch Lomond, Loch Lomond, Scotland
Sea Life London Aquarium, London, England
Sea Life Manchester, Manchester, England
Sea Life Scarborough, Scarborough, England
Sea Life Weymouth, Weymouth, England

Others
Gardaland, Italy
Legoland Billund, Billund, Denmark
Sea Life Benalmádena, Benalmádena, Spain
Sea Life Blankenberge, Blankenberge, Belgium
Sea Life Bray, Bray, Ireland
Sea Life Helsinki, Helsinki, Finland
Sea Life Istanbul, Istanbul, Turkey
Sea Life Paris, Paris, France
Sea Life Porto, Porto, Portugal
Sea Life Scheveningen, The Hague, Netherlands

Former sites
 Cuxhaven
 Hastings, England - Sea Life Hastings - sold and now belongs to the Blue Reef Aquarium chain
 Jesolo Sea Life
 Oban, Scotland - Scottish Sea Life Sanctuary - closed in October 2018
 St. Andrews, Scotland - sold and now operates as the St. Andrews Aquarium
 Königswinter, Germany - closed in December 2022

North America

 Legoland California
 Sea Life Arizona
 Sea Life at Mall of America
 Sea Life Charlotte-Concord 
 Sea Life Grapevine
 Sea Life Kansas City
 Sea Life Michigan
 Sea Life New Jersey
 Sea Life Orlando
 Sea Life San Antonio

Oceania

Kelly Tarlton's Sea Life Aquarium, Auckland, New Zealand
Sea Life Melbourne, Australia 
Sea Life Sunshine Coast, Australia
Sea Life Sydney, Australia

Controversies
Sea Life centres have been criticised over animal welfare, with the Marine Conservation Society calling a 30% mortality rate "disturbing." The charity Freedom for Animals has criticised Sea Life over their conservation claims and also for the presence of Beluga whales at attractions.

References

External links
 
 

 
Entertainment companies established in 1989
Companies based in Dorset
Aquariums
Aquaria in the United Kingdom
Aquaria in Germany
Aquaria in Turkey
Aquaria in Australia
Aquaria in Malaysia
Aquaria in France
Aquaria in Thailand
Aquaria in Japan
Aquaria in China
Aquaria in South Korea
Aquaria in Portugal
Aquaria in the United States
Chessington World of Adventures
Oceanaria